Ashwattha (Gujarati: અશ્વત્થ) is a collection of poems written by Natwarlal Kuberdas Pandya, also known as Ushnas, in Gujarati. The book won the Sahitya Akademi Award for Gujarati in 1976. It is considered Ushnas's finest work in Gujarati.

History 
Ushnas wrote the poems between 1966 and 1973. They were published in various Gujarati literary magazines including Kumar and Samarpan. The book was first published in 1975 by Vora & Company, in Ahmedabad.

Content 
The book consists of 128 poems composed in different forms, including sonnets, geets, free verse, haiku, ghazals and muktak.

Awards 
The book won the Sahitya Akademi Award (1976) for Gujarati language.

References

External links
 

1975 poetry books
Gujarati-language books
Gujarati-language poetry collections
Indian poetry collections
20th-century Indian books
Sahitya Akademi Award-winning works